Gren Jones (23 November 1932 – 15 October 1991) was an English professional footballer who played as a right winger.

Career
Born in Nuneaton, Jones played for West Bromwich Albion, Wrexham and Prague (Australia).

References

1932 births
1991 deaths
English footballers
West Bromwich Albion F.C. players
Wrexham A.F.C. players
English Football League players
Association football wingers
English expatriate footballers
English expatriate sportspeople in Australia
Expatriate soccer players in Australia
Sportspeople from Nuneaton